One Day in a Life is a 2008 Italian drama film directed by Stefano Tummolini. It entered the "Venice Days" section at the 65th Venice International Film Festival.

Cast 

Antonio Merone: Salvatore
Lucia Mascino: Daniela
Francesco Grifoni: Cristiano
Chiara Francini: Stella
Tiziana Avarista: Eva

References

External links

2008 films
Italian drama films
2008 drama films
Italian LGBT-related films
LGBT-related drama films

2008 LGBT-related films
2000s Italian films